Kais al Saadi (born 6 November 1976) is a German field hockey coach of the German national team.

He managed the German team at the 2020 Summer Olympics. After the Olympics his contract was not extended.

References

External links
Tokyo 2020 profile

1976 births
Living people
German field hockey coaches
German Olympic coaches